Melissa Magstadt is an American politician and a Republican member of the South Dakota House of Representatives representing District 5 since January 11, 2011.

Elections
2012 Magstadt and incumbent Representative Roger Solum were unopposed for the June 5, 2012 Republican Primary and won the three-way November 6, 2012 General election where Madstadt took the first seat with 5,950 votes (40.11%) and incumbent Republican Representative Solum took the second seat ahead of Democratic nominee Dorothy Kellogg.
2010 When incumbent Republican Representative Bob Faehn left the Legislature and left a District 5 seat open, Magstadt ran in the three-way June 8, 2010 Republican Primary where Madstadt placed first with 1,126 votes (36.92%); in the three-way November 2, 2010 General election Madstadt took the first seat with 4,681 votes (35.50%) and incumbent Republican Representative Solum took the second seat ahead of Democratic nominee Jeff Dunn.

References

External links
Official page at the South Dakota Legislature
 

Place of birth missing (living people)
Year of birth missing (living people)
Living people
Republican Party members of the South Dakota House of Representatives
People from Watertown, South Dakota
Women state legislators in South Dakota
21st-century American politicians
21st-century American women politicians